Grigory Abramovich Gurev  (1891–1978) was a Soviet philosopher, popularizer of anti-religious knowledge, the author of several books on the history of religion and atheism. 

Major works: "The Great Conflict" (1965), "The Story of a Single Misconception" (1970), "Charles Darwin and Atheism" (1975).

Books
In Russian
 Как религия боролась с наукой (How Religion Struggled with Science). – [Москва] : акц. о-во "Безбожник", [19--] (тип. изд-ва "Крестьянская газета"). – [3] с.; 
 Наука и религия о вселенной (Science and Religion of the Universe) : Науч.-попул. очерк. – [Москва] : Изд. и ф-ка юношеской книги изд-ва "Мол. гвардия", 1938. – 103 с. : ил.;
 Земля и небо (Earth and Sky) : [Очерки по истории астрономии] : [Для ст. возраста]. – Москва ; Ленинград : Детиздат, 1939 (Москва). – 136 с. : ил.;
 Земля и небо (Earth and Sky) : [Очерки по истории астрономии]. – Москва ; Ленинград : Детиздат, 1940 (Москва). – 152 с. : ил. и черт.; 20 см. – (Школьная библиотека. Для неполной средней и средней школы).
 Откуда пошел род человеческий (Where did the Human Race Come from). – Москва : ГАИЗ, 1940. – 80 с., 5 вкл. л. ил. и портр. : ил. и портр.
 Астрология и религия (Astrology and Religion) : История одного заблуждения. – Москва : ГАИЗ, 1940. – 132 с., 1 вкл. л. ил. : ил. и черт.;
 Марксизм-ленинизм о происхождении религии (Marxism–Leninism on the Origin of Religion). – Москва : Знание, 1953. – 32 с.; 22 см. – (Всесоюзное общество по распространению политических и научных знаний. Серия 2; No. 6).
 О вере в бога (On Faith in God) : Беседы с верующими и неверующими. – Москва : Госполитиздат, 1954. – 84 с.;
 О вере в бога (On Faith in God) : [Школьникам об атеизме]. – 2-е изд., перераб. и доп. – Москва : Учпедгиз, 1961. – 104 с.; 20 см.
 Научные предвидения и религиозные предрассудки (Scientific Foresight and Religious Prejudices). – Москва : Воениздат, 1955. – 88 с.;
 Научные предвидения и религиозные предрассудки (Scientific Foresight and Religious Prejudices). – 2-е изд., доп. – Москва : Воениздат, 1958. – 125 с.; 20 см. – (Научно-популярная б-ка).
 Как произошел человеческий род (How did the Human Race Come from). – Москва : Моск. рабочий, 1955. – 104 с. : ил.
 Что такое Вселенная (What is the Universe). – 2-е изд., перераб. – Москва : Гостехиздат, 1955. – 200 с. : ил.;
 Наука и религия о строении Вселенной (Science and Religion about the Structure of the Universe). – [Москва] : Мол. гвардия, 1955. – 64 с.;
 Что такое Вселенная (What is the Universe). – 3-е изд., стер. – Москва : Гостехиздат, 1957. – 200 с. : ил.;
 О вере в бессмертие души (On Faith in the Immortality of the Soul). – Москва : Госполитиздат, 1957. – 52 с.;
 О смысле жизни (On the Meaning of Life) : (Критика религиозных представлений). – Москва : [б. и.], 1958. – 39 с.;
 Сотворена ли Вселенная? (Is the Universe Created?). – Москва : Знание, 1957. – 32 с.; 22 см. – (Серия 11/ Всесоюз. о-во по распространению полит. и науч. знаний; No. 9).
 Сотворена ли Вселенная? (Is the Universe Created?) – Москва : Сов. Россия, 1963. – 59 с.; 14 см. – (Отвечаем на вопросы верующих). 
In Bulgarian
 Развитие на човешкия род / Г. А. Гурев ; Превел от руски Марко Марчевски. – 2-ро изд. – София : Нариздат, 1945. – 76 с. : ил.;
 Сътворена ли е вселената? / Г. А. Гурев ; Прев. от рус. Катя Койчева. – [София] : Профиздат, 1960. – 70 с.; 15 см. – (Научно-атеистични знания; No. 8. 1960). 
 Дарвинизъм и религия : Из историята на идеологичната борба в биологията / Г. А. Гурев ; Прев. от рус. Екатерина Пеева. – София : Наука и изкуство, 1959. – 233 с.; 
 За вярата в безсмъртие на душата / Г. А. Гурев ; Прев. от рус. Л. Цветаров. – София : Изд-во на Нац. съвет на Отечеств. фронт, 1960. – 48 с.; 22 см. – (Библиотека политически и научни знания; 10).
 Учението на Коперник и религията [Текст] / Прев. от рус. Драгомир Николаев. – София : Изд-во на Бълг. ком. партия, 1967. – 195 с.;
 За вярата в бога : Беседи с вярващи и невярващи / Г. А. Гурев ; Прев. от рус. език Мария Шарланджиева. – София : Народна младеж, 1955. – 72 с.;  
In German
 Wie der Darwinismus von den malthusianistischen Fehlern befreit wurde : Stenogramm eines öffentlichen Vortrages der Unionsgesellschaft zur Verbreitung politischer und wissenschaftlicher Kenntnisse in Moskau / Von G. A. Gurew. – Berlin : Aufbau-Verl., 1953. – 44 с.; 19 см. – (Kulturbund zur demokratischen Erneuerung Deutschlands. Vorträge zur Verbreitung wissenschaftlicher Kenntnisse; 40).
 Über den Glauben an Gott : Gespräche mit Gläubigen und Nichtgläubigen : Übers. nach dem russisch. Orig. / G. A. Gurew. – Bukarest : Politischer Verl., 1958. – 110 с.; 
In Greek
 Τό σύμπαν  / Γ. Α. Γκοῦριεφ. – [Б. м.] : Νέα Ἑλλάδα, 1951. – 62 с. : ил.; 16 см. – (Ἐκλαϊκευτική βιβλιοθήκη; 3)
In Romanian
 Despre credinţa în dumnezeu : De vorba cu credincioşi şi necredincioşi : [Trad. din limba rusă] / G. A. Gurev. – București : Ed. de stat pentru literatură politică, 1956. – 90 p.;
In Hungarian
 Az istenhitről / G. A. Gurjev ; Ford. Auer Kálmán. – Budapest : Szikra, 1955. – 79 с.;
 Tudományos előrelátás és vallásos jóslatok; A tudomány és a vallás a világmindenség szerkezetéről / G. A. Gurev ; Ford. Moor Albert és Sártói Ambrus. – Budapest : Művelt nép, 1952. – 62 с.;
In Polish 
 O wierze w boga : Pogadanki z wierzącymi i niewierzącymi / G. A. Guriew ; Przeł. J. Docenko. – Wilnius : Państw. wyd-wo literatury politycznej i naukowej, 1955. – 85 с.;
 Co to jest wszechświat / G. Guriew ; Przekł. z wyd. 2-go, przerobionego I. Tarasiejski. – Wilnius : Państ. wyd. literatury polit. i naukowej, 1956. – 226 s. : il.;
 Nauka i religia o budowie wszechświata : Stenogram odczytu publicznego ... / G. Guriew ; Przełożył J. Zaborowski ; Wszechzwiązkowe t-wo krzewienia wiedzy politycznej i naukowej. – Wilnius : Państwowe wyd-wo literatury politycznej i naukowej, 1951. – 35 с.; 
In Slovak
 Vedecké predvídania a náboženské proroctvá / G. A. Gurev ; Prel. Ján Štefánik. – Martin : Osveta, 1953. – 26 с.;

References
 Atheistic Dictionary / Гурев Григорий Абрамович

1891 births
1978 deaths
Christ myth theory proponents
Historians of Christianity
Russian historians of religion
Soviet atheists
Soviet historians
Russian atheism activists